The 2020 season for the Mitchelton–Scott cycling team began in January at the Tour Down Under.

Team roster

Riders who joined the team for the 2020 season

Riders who left the team during or after the 2019 season

Season victories

National, Continental and World champions

Footnotes

References

External links

 
 

2020 road cycling season by team
2020
2020 in Australian sport